The Penal Procedure Code of Romania is the basic document governing criminal procedure in Romania. The current code came into force on 1 February 2014, alongside a new Penal Code.

See also
Law of Romania
Penal Code of Romania

Romania
Law of Romania
2014 in law
2014 in Romania